The Aboitiz Pitch at The Outlets is a multi-sport venue in Lipa, Batangas, Philippines .

Background
The Aboitiz Pitch with a 1,500 seating capacity is part of The Outlets at Lipa retail development of Lima Land Inc., a company under Aboitiz Equity Ventures. It opened in June 2018.

Tenants
The Aboitiz Football Cup held its first edition in Luzon in October 2018 in the Aboitiz Pitch at Lipa.

Green Archers United of the Philippines Football League (PFL) used the facility as their home venue with their 4–0 win over Philippine Air Force on August 4, 2019, as their first official home match at the venue. Other matches of the PFL were also played in the venue with the August 3, 2019 tie between Mendiola and Global Makati being the first league match held at the venue. Mendiola won 4–0 in that match.

References

Football venues in the Philippines
Sports in Batangas